"Pocket Full of Gold" is a song co-written and recorded by American country music artist Vince Gill.  It was released in January 1991 as the first single and title track from the album Pocket Full of Gold.  The song reached number 7 on the Billboard Hot Country Singles & Tracks chart.  It was written by Gill and Brian Allsmiller.

Music video
The music video was directed by John Lloyd Miller and premiered in early 1991.

Personnel
Compiled from the liner notes.
Eddie Bayers – drums
Barry Beckett – piano
Vince Gill – lead and backing vocals
John Hughey – steel guitar
Patty Loveless – backing vocals
Mac McAnally – acoustic guitar
Billy Joe Walker Jr. – electric guitar
Pete Wasner – keyboards
Willie Weeks – bass guitar

Chart performance

References

1991 singles
Vince Gill songs
Songs written by Vince Gill
Song recordings produced by Tony Brown (record producer)
MCA Records singles
Music videos directed by John Lloyd Miller
1991 songs